Discalis is a genus of extinct vascular plants of the Early Devonian  (Pragian or Siegenian stage, around ). The name is derived from the Greek , referring to the disc-shaped sporangia (spore-forming organs). The genus was first described by Hao in 1989 based on fossil specimens from the Posongchong Formation, Wenshan district, Yunnan, China.

Description
The stems which did not bear sporangia had coiled (circinnate) tips. Fertile stems bore disc-shaped sporangia laterally on stalks up to 5 mm long, forming open spikes. Vascular tissue was present in the stems, with tracheids having annular, spiral thickenings.

D. longistipa somewhat resembles Sawdonia, but differs in branching pattern and in the arrangement of the sporangia, including their long stalks.

Phylogeny
The evolutionary relationship between spines in early plants and the small leaves ('lycophylls') of later lycoposids (club-mosses and allies) has been much discussed. Hao considered that the spines of Discalis could be precursors of lycophylls. Boyce regarded the occurrence of the spines of Discalis on sporangia as evidence that they were not related to lycophylls in this way.

A cladogram published in 2004 by Crane et al. places Discalis in a paraphyletic stem group of broadly defined "zosterophylls", basal to the lycopsids (living and extinct clubmosses and relatives).

Hao and Xue in 2013 used the absence of terminal sporangia to place the genus in the paraphyletic order Gosslingiales, in the family Discaliaceae. The Gosslingiales are considered to be zosterophylls with indeterminate growth and fertile branches generally showing circinate vernation (initially curled up).

References

External links
Cladogram from 

Early Devonian plants
Zosterophylls
Prehistoric lycophyte genera